Selnik may refer to:

 Selnik, North Macedonia, a village in the Municipality of Delčevo
 Selnik, Slovenia, a village in the Municipality of Ig
 Selnik, Ludbreg, a village near Ludbreg, Varaždin County, Croatia
 Selnik, Maruševec, a village near Maruševec, Varaždin County, Croatia